Odd Berg (8 November 1923 – 19 May 2021) was a Norwegian cyclist. He competed in the individual and team road race events at the 1952 Summer Olympics. He won the Norwegian National Road Race Championship in 1951, 1952 and 1955.

References

External links
 

1923 births
2021 deaths
Norwegian male cyclists
Olympic cyclists of Norway
Cyclists at the 1952 Summer Olympics
Sportspeople from Trondheim